Sor Juana is a crater on Mercury.  Its name was adopted by the International Astronomical Union (IAU) in 1979, and is named for the Mexican writer and poet Sor Juana Inés de la Cruz.

Sor Juana is a relatively young crater as its floor is covered with impact melt, but it does not have a ray system such as that of Hokusai or Kuiper.

Sor Juana lies east of Victoria Rupes.

References

Impact craters on Mercury